Adam Wladyslaw Kogut (4 December 1895 – 16 April 1940) was a Polish footballer. He played in one match for the Poland national football team in 1922. His notable football clubs included Cracovia and Polonia Warsaw.

He was murdered in the Katyn Massacre during World War II.

References

External links
 

1895 births
1940 deaths
Polish footballers
Poland international footballers
Footballers from Kraków
Association footballers not categorized by position
Katyn massacre victims
Polish military personnel killed in World War II